Petunu Opeloge (born ) is a Samoan male weightlifter, competing in the 85 kg category and representing Samoa at international competitions. Opeloge won the silver medal at the 2013 Pacific Mini Games, 2015 Pacific Games and also the silver medal at the 2016 Oceania Weightlifting Championships. He participated at the 2010 Commonwealth Games in the 85 kg event and the 2014 Commonwealth Games.

Major competitions

References

External links

1994 births
Living people
Samoan male weightlifters
Weightlifters at the 2010 Commonwealth Games
Commonwealth Games competitors for Samoa
Place of birth missing (living people)
Weightlifters at the 2014 Commonwealth Games
20th-century Samoan people
21st-century Samoan people